Wike, WIKE, or Wyke may refer to:

People
Surname
 Eberechi Wike, a Rivers State High Court judge
 Ezenwo Nyesom Wike, Nigerian politician
 Tasie Wike, a lawyer

Places
 Wike, West Yorkshire, a hamlet in Leeds, England
 Wyke, Bradford, an area in Bradford, West Yorkshire, England

Technology
 WIKE, a radio station in the United States
 Wike (software), a Wikipedia reader for the GNOME desktop

See also
 Wyke (disambiguation)